Mária Frank (8 September 1943 – 20 November 1992) was a Hungarian swimmer who won a bronze medal in the 4 × 100 m freestyle relay at the 1962 European Aquatics Championships. She finished fourth in the same event at the 1960 and 1964 Summer Olympics.

In 1964 she retired from swimming and later became a renowned pediatrician. After her untimely death in 1992, her husband, Dr. Renn Oscar, helped establish the annual Mária Frank Award for achievements in child healing.

References

1943 births
1992 deaths
Sportspeople from Zrenjanin
Swimmers at the 1960 Summer Olympics
Swimmers at the 1964 Summer Olympics
Olympic swimmers of Hungary
Hungarian pediatricians
European Aquatics Championships medalists in swimming
Hungarian female freestyle swimmers
Universiade medalists in swimming
Universiade silver medalists for Hungary
Medalists at the 1963 Summer Universiade
20th-century Hungarian women